Arthur Kattendyke Strange David Archibald Gore, 8th Earl of Arran (5 July 1910 – 23 February 1983), styled Lord Arran, was a British columnist and politician who served as the Conservative whip in the House of Lords. He is known for leading the effort in the House of Lords to decriminalise male homosexuality in 1967, following the suicide of his gay brother.

Early life and education

Gore was the second son of Arthur Gore, 6th Earl of Arran and Maud Jacqueline Marie Beauclerk, only daughter of 3rd Baron Huyssen van Kattendyke of Kattendijke, Zeeland, Holland. He was affectionately known as "Boofy".

He was educated at Eton and Balliol College, Oxford.

Career

During the Second World War, Gore worked first as a press attaché at the British Legion in Bern (1939–45) and at the British Embassy in Lisbon (1941–42). He was deputy director of the overseas general division of the Ministry of Information (1943–45) and was secretariat director at the Central Office of Information (1945–49).

In 1958, Gore succeeded his elder brother, who had committed suicide reportedly because he was gay, to become the 8th Earl of Arran and became an active member of the House of Lords.

Arran was the sponsor in the House of Lords of Labour MP Leo Abse's 1967 private member's bill which, as the Sexual Offences Act 1967, decriminalised homosexual acts between two consenting adult men. He was of the opinion that "no amount of legislation will prevent homosexuals from being the subject of dislike and derision, or at best of pity". He also sponsored a bill for the protection of badgers, and was once asked why this effort had failed whereas decriminalising homosexuality had succeeded. Arran is reported to have replied: "There are not many badgers in the House of Lords."

He was an outspoken columnist for many years, writing for The Evening Standard, The Guardian, Encounter, Punch, The Observer, The Daily Mail, and others. At one point he described himself as "a poor man's Duke of Bedford and a rich man's Godfrey Winn". His columns, which often contained inflammatory and abusive language, were tagged as coming from "The outrageous Arran, the Earl you love to hate." As an example, he once wrote of the Irish, in the Evening Standard in October 1974: "I loathe and detest the miserable bastards [...], savage murderous thugs. May the Irish, all of them, rot in Hell".

Marriage and issue
He married Fiona Bryde Colquhoun (1918–2013), eldest daughter of Sir Iain Colquhoun, 7th Baronet. She was a speedboat racer and, like her husband, an animal rights activist. The couple had homes in Hertfordshire and Scotland.

They had two sons:
 Arthur, Viscount Sudley (born 1938), who succeeded his father as 9th Earl of Arran
 Hon. Philip Gore (1943–1975)

He died at his home near Hemel Hempstead, aged 72.

Popular culture
Gore was portrayed by David Bamber in the 2018 BBC limited television series A Very English Scandal. BBC 'Travel' documented the Inchconnachan island and the in-habitation of kangaroos by speaking to Lady Colquhoun in mid to late 2021.

References

External links

1910 births
1983 deaths
British people of Dutch descent
Conservative Party (UK) hereditary peers
Arthur
People educated at Eton College
Alumni of Balliol College, Oxford
Earls of Arran (Ireland)
British columnists
20th-century British journalists